The Arab Swimming Championships are the Arab championships in the sport of Swimming. It is organized by the Arab Swimming Confederation (ASC) and held biennially. The first edition was held in August 2012 in Amman, Jordan.

Championships

Long Course

Short Course

All-time medal table

See also
 Junior Arab Swimming Championships
 Arab Aquatics Championships

References

 
International swimming competitions
Swimming competitions in Asia
Swimming competitions in Africa
Recurring sporting events established in 2012